A swing bridge (or swing span bridge) is a movable bridge that has as its primary structural support a vertical locating pin and support ring, usually at or near to its center of gravity, about which the swing span (turning  span) can then pivot horizontally as shown in the animated illustration to the right. Small swing bridges as found over canals may be pivoted only at one end, opening as would a gate, but require substantial underground structure to support the pivot.

In its closed position, a swing bridge carrying a road or railway over a river or canal, for example, allows traffic to cross. When a water vessel needs to pass the bridge, road traffic is stopped (usually by traffic signals and barriers), and then motors rotate the bridge horizontally about its pivot point. The typical swing bridge will rotate approximately 90 degrees, or one-quarter turn; however, a bridge which intersects the navigation channel at an oblique angle may be built to rotate only 45 degrees, or one-eighth turn, in order to clear the channel.

Advantages

As this type requires no counterweights, the complete weight is significantly reduced as compared to other moveable bridges.
Where the channel is wide enough for separate traffic directions on each side, the likelihood of vessel-to-vessel collisions is reduced.
The central support is often mounted upon a berm along the axis of the watercourse, intended to protect the bridge from watercraft collisions when it is opened. This artificial island forms an excellent construction area for building the moveable span, as the construction will not impede traffic.

Disadvantages

 In a symmetrical bridge, the central pier forms a hazard to navigation. Asymmetrical bridges may place the pivot near one side of the channel.
 Where a wide channel is not available, a large portion of the bridge may be over an area that would be easily spanned by other means.
 A wide channel will be reduced by the center pivot and foundation.
 When open, the bridge will have to maintain its own weight as a balanced double cantilever, while when closed and in use for traffic, the live loads will be distributed as in a pair of conventional truss bridges, which may require additional stiffness in some members whose loading will be alternately in compression and tension.
 If struck from the water near the edge of the span, it may rotate enough to cause safety problems (see Big Bayou Canot rail accident).

Examples

Albania
Buna River Bridge, in Shkodra, Albania.

Argentina
Puente de la Mujer, an asymmetrical cable-stayed span.

Australia
Gladesville Bridge, Sydney. Opened 1881, closed 1964 and demolished; had a small swing span on the southern end.
 Pyrmont Bridge, Sydney. Opened 1902. Closed to traffic 1988. Still in use as a pedestrian bridge.
 Glebe Island Bridge, Sydney. Opened 1903. Tramway defunct. Closed to traffic, 1995; supplanted by Anzac Bridge. Still in existence.
Hay Bridge, Hay, New South Wales. Opened 1873, demolished 1973. Replaced by a fixed concrete bridge.
 Victoria Bridge, Townsville, Queensland. Opened 1889, closed to traffic 1975. Still in use as a foot bridge.
 Sale Swing Bridge, Sale, Victoria. Opened 1883. Closed to traffic in 2002. Restored to full working order in 2006.
 Dunalley Bridge, Dunalley, Tasmania. Still in use.

Belize
 Belize City Swing Bridge, Belize City, Belize. Oldest such bridge in Central America and one of the few manually operated swing bridge in world still in operation. (Restored in the 2000s)

Canada

China
 , across Hai River in Tianjin

Denmark
Lille Langebro Pedestrian double swing bridge crossing the inner harbour at Copenhagen.

Egypt

 The longest swing bridge span is 340 metres, by the El Ferdan Railway Bridge across the Suez Canal.

France
 Le pont tournant rue Dieu, across the Canal Saint-Martin in Paris, is a distinctive location in the 1938 film Hôtel du Nord, and is featured in the opening shot of the film.

Germany
 Kaiser-Wilhelm-Brücke in Wilhelmshaven, built in 1907, with a length of 159m, it was once Europe's biggest swing bridge.

India

 Garden Reach Road Swing Bridge, for Calcutta Port, Kidderpore, Kolkata
 Poira-Corjuem Bridge, for GSIDC, Corjuem, Goa by Rajdeep Buildcon Pvt. Ltd.

Ireland
 Samuel Beckett Bridge, Dublin
 Seán O'Casey Bridge, Dublin
 Michael Davitt Bridge, County Mayo
 Portumna bridge, between County Galway and County Tipperary

Italy

 Ponte Girevole, Taranto (built in 1958, after an 1887 one of similar design but using different materials) – a very unusual type, with two spans that separate at the bridge's center and pivot sideways from the bridge's outer ends.

Latvia
 Kalpaka Tilts, Liepāja, connecting the city with the former Russian/Soviet port Karosta.

Lithuania 

 Chain Bridge, Klaipeda. Built in 1855 and still working today, this is the only swing bridge in Lithuania. When the bridge is turned, boats and yachts can enter the Castle port. Rotation of the bridge is manual; two people can rotate the bridge.

The Netherlands

 The "Abtsewoudsebrug" in Delft, close to the Technische Universiteit Delft, is a bridge of this type. 
 There are four bridges of this type in use on the Afsluitdijk (Enclosure dam). They span the waterways that link the shipping lock complexes to the Wadden Sea.
 There is another one on the channel between Ghent (Belgium) and Terneuzen (The Netherlands) at Sas Van Gent.

Many inner cities have swing bridges, since these require less street space than other types of bridges.

New Zealand
 Kopu Bridge, Waihou River, near Thames, New Zealand
(A "swing bridge" in New Zealand refers to a flexible walking track bridge which "swings" as you walk across.)

Panama
 A swing bridge at the Gatun Locks provides the only road passage over the Atlantic side of the Panama Canal. This is a small bridge that swings out from each side. Another larger swing bridge at the Miraflores Locks is on the Pacific side but is rarely used, having been supplanted by the Bridge of the Americas and the Centennial Bridge.

Poland
 A swing bridge at the Giżycko is one of four bridges that cross over the Luczanski Channel. It is one of ten (four still in operation) swing bridges in Poland.

South Africa

 The Clocktower Bridge is a pedestrian swing bridge at the Victoria and Alfred Waterfront in Cape Town.

Ukraine
 Varvarivskyi Bridge over the Southern Bug in Mykolaiv, with Europe's longest span (134 m)

United Kingdom

In the UK, there is a legal definition in current statute as to what is, or is not a 'swing bridge' 

 Acton swing bridge – road
 Barmouth Bridge – rail
 Beccles swing bridge – rail
 Bell's Bridge, Glasgow – pedestrian
 Bethells Swing Bridge
 Boothferry swing bridge at Boothferry, Yorkshire (see article for image)
 Caernarfon swing bridge
 Connaught Crossing in London Docklands, built as a low-rising swing bridge to allow marine traffic in the Royal Docks to pass at a place when the proximity of London City Airport meant a higher fixed bridge was not practicable.
 Cross Keys Bridge in Sutton Bridge – carries the A17 road over the River Nene in Lincolnshire
 Folkestone Harbour railway station – railway bridge on the branch line.
 Goole railway swing bridge
 Glasson Dock swing bridge
 Hawarden Railway Bridge – rail (now deactivated).
 Hull, England docks branch bridge – rail
 Kennet and Avon Canal at Tyle Mill Lock, Sulhamstead, Berkshire
 Kincardine Bridge – crossing the Firth of Forth from Falkirk council area to Kincardine-on-Forth, Fife (now deactivated).
 Leeds and Liverpool Canal Has a large number of swing bridges, especially between Bingley and Skipton and Burscough and Liverpool. Many are manually operated, carrying only farm tracks, but a significant number carry road traffic and are mechanised for boater operation.
 Manchester Ship Canal at Latchford, Stockton Heath and Lower Walton in Warrington, and also slightly further west at Moore. Near the eastern end of the canal in Salford, the Barton Road Swing Bridge is adjacent to the Barton Swing Aqueduct – a 234-foot, 800-ton trough holding some 800 tons of water (retained by gates at either end) swings so that it is at right angles to the Bridgewater Canal to allow ships to pass up the Ship Canal.
 Oulton Broad swing bridge – rail
 Reedham Swing Bridge – rail
 Ross Bridge, Penzance
 Sandwich Toll Bridge (rebuilt 1892)
 Selby swing bridge – rail
 Somerleyton swing bridge
 Trowse Bridge at Norwich. Carries the electrified Great Eastern Main Line over the River Yare. It is the only overhead electrified swing bridge in the country.
 Tyne swing bridge at Newcastle Upon Tyne, which has an 85.7-metre cantilevered span with a central axis of rotation able to move through 90° to allow vessels to pass on either side of it.
 Whitby Swing Bridge over the River Esk at Whitby, North Yorkshire, with two swing leaves (though only one is usually opened).
Yar Swing Bridge, Yarmouth, Isle of Wight

United States

 CSXT Blackwater River bridge in Milton, Florida.
 Alanson Swing Bridge, billed as America's shortest swing bridge, crossing the Crooked River in Alanson, Michigan. The world's shortest are located in the United Kingdom over some of the narrowest canals in the world. Examples here: www.stroudvalleyscanal.co.uk/swingBridges. Or, see Yar Swing Bridge above.
 Ben Sawyer Bridge, connecting the city of Mount Pleasant, South Carolina, with Sullivan's Island
 Berkley–Dighton Bridge (1896), connecting the towns of Berkley and Dighton, Massachusetts, crossing the Taunton River; removed in 2010. The replacement bridge is not a swing structure.
 Black Point Bridge carrying Northwestern Pacific Railroad over the Petaluma River at Black Point-Green Point, California
 Blackburn Point Road Bridge, over the Intracoastal Waterway in Osprey, Florida
 Bridge No. 4455, Central Avenue over Lewis Gut, Bridgeport, Connecticut (1924 steel swing bridge)
 Bridgeport Swing Bridge, Bridgeport, Alabama (demolished in the late 1970s, replaced with new span)
 Burlington Northern Railroad Bridge 9.6 (or BNSF Railway Bridge 9.6), crossing the Columbia River, from Portland, Oregon, to Vancouver, Washington, built in 1908.
 Center Street Bridge, Cleveland, Ohio (1901)
 Chef Menteur Bridge, near Slidell, Louisiana
 Chincoteague Channel Swing Bridge, Chincoteague, Virginia (demolished)
 Choptank River, modest swing bridge carrying former Baltimore & Eastern Railroad (PRR subsidiary) at Denton, Maryland (disused and isolated)
 Clinton Railroad Bridge crossing the Mississippi River, Clinton, Iowa
 Columbus Drive Bridge, Tampa, Florida, a bobtail swing bridge over the Hillsborough River
 CSX Rail Bridge, Indiantown, Florida
 Curtis Creek Rail Bridge, Baltimore, Maryland
 Deweyville Swing Bridge, crossing the Sabine River east of Deweyville, Texas
 Dubuque Rail Bridge, crossing the Mississippi River and connecting Dubuque, Iowa with East Dubuque, Illinois
 Dumbarton Rail Bridge, crossing San Francisco Bay in California (1910); since being decommissioned, the swing portion of the bridge has been welded open.
 East Haddam Bridge, Route 82 over the Connecticut River, East Haddam, Connecticut (1913)
 Fort Madison Toll Bridge, crossing the Mississippi River and connecting Fort Madison, Iowa with Niota, Illinois
 Fort Pike Bridge, near Slidell and New Orleans, Louisiana
 Fort Denaud Bridge, near LaBelle and Alva, Florida

 Figure Eight Island Bridge, north of Wilmington, North Carolina
 Frederick Douglass Memorial Bridge, Washington, D.C.
 Gasparilla Island Bridge, Built in 1958, this bridge is used for passage between Placida, FL to the island of Boca Grande. A replacement bridge is under construction, with projected completion in August 2016.
 George P. Coleman Memorial Bridge, over the York River between Yorktown and Gloucester Point, Virginia
Gianella Bridge, near Hamilton City California, connecting Glenn and Butte Counties over the Sacramento River, It was built in 1937 and demolished in 1987.
 Government Bridge on the Mississippi River between Davenport, Iowa and Rock Island, Illinois (1896)
 Grand Haven GTW RR Swing Bridge, connecting Grand Haven and Ferrysburg, Michigan
 Grand Rapids Swing Bridge, Grand Rapids, Michigan
 Grosse Ile Toll Bridge and nearby Wayne County Bridge, Grosse Ile, Michigan
 Hannibal Bridge (1869, demolished) and Second Hannibal Bridge (1917), Kansas City, Missouri, crossing the Missouri River
 Harlem River bridges in New York City, including from south to north:
 Willis Avenue Bridge
 Third Avenue Bridge
 Madison Avenue Bridge
 145th Street Bridge
 Macombs Dam Bridge
 University Heights Bridge
 Spuyten Duyvil Bridge
 Harmar Railroad Bridge, Marietta, Ohio
 Hodgdon Island Bridge, Boothbay, Maine. This is one of two manual swing bridges in Maine (see Songo Locks in Naples, Maine)

 I Street Bridge, Sacramento, California
 India Point Railroad Bridge, Providence, Rhode Island crossing the Seekonk River
 International Railway Bridge connecting Buffalo, New York and Fort Erie, Ontario, Canada
 La Crosse Rail Bridge, crossing the Mississippi River between La Crescent, Minnesota, and La Crosse, Wisconsin
 Livingston Avenue Bridge, Albany, New York
 Mathers Bridge, connecting Merritt Island to Indian Harbour Beach, Florida across the Banana River
 Middle Branch of Patapsco River Rail Bridge, near Camden Yards, Baltimore, Maryland
 Mystic River Railroad Bridge, Mystic, Connecticut, carries Amtrak's Northeast Corridor tracks over the Mystic River.
 New Bedford-Fairhaven Bridge, connecting New Bedford and Fairhaven, Massachusetts
 New Richmond Swing Bridge, near Fennville, Michigan
 Norfolk Southern Railway Bridge crossing the Maumee River, Toledo, Ohio
 Norfolk Southern Railway Bridge crossing the Ocmulgee River in Lumber City, Georgia ( long; built 1916) (electrical swing components removed)
 Northern Avenue Bridge over Fort Point Channel in Boston, Massachusetts (1908 steel truss)
 North Landing Bridge, built in the 1950s, on the Atlantic Intracoastal Waterway where it forms part of the border between Chesapeake and Virginia Beach, Virginia,
 Omaha Road Bridge Number 15, an asymmetrical single-track railroad bridge over the Mississippi River between Saint Paul and Lilydale, Minnesota (1916)
 Oregon Slough Railroad Bridge (1908), Portland, Oregon
 Padanaram Bridge on the causeway protecting Apponagansett Bay in Dartmouth, Massachusetts
Passaic River in Newark, New Jersey
Jackson Street Bridge
Bridge Street Bridge
Clay Street Bridge
 Pennsylvania Railroad's Shellpot Branch over the Christina River in Wilmington, Delaware (original two-track bridge replaced with a single-track bridge in 2003)
 Pennsylvania Railroad's South Philadelphia Branch Bridge over the Schuylkill River, Philadelphia, Pennsylvania
 Point Street Bridge, Providence, Rhode Island crossing the Providence River
 Portal Bridge, carrying the Northeast Corridor over the Hackensack River between Kearny and Secaucus, New Jersey
 Providence & Worcester railroad bridge, Middletown, Connecticut
 Richard V. Woods Memorial Bridge over the Beaufort River/Intracoastal Waterway in Beaufort, South Carolina
 Riverside-Delanco Bridge over Rancocas Creek in New Jersey
 Rock Island Swing Bridge over the Mississippi River between Inver Grove Heights and St. Paul Park, Minnesota
 "S" Swing Bridge over the Perquimans River, Hertford, North Carolina.
 Sakonnet River rail bridge, crossing the Sakonnet River between Tiverton and Portsmouth, Rhode Island
 Saugatuck River Bridge (Bridge No. 1349), Route 136 over the Saugatuck River, Westport, Connecticut (1884 iron-truss swing bridge)
 Shaw Cove Railroad Bridge, New London, Connecticut, carrying Amtrak's Northeast Corridor tracks over the entrance to Shaw Cove in New London
 Snow-Reed Swing Bridge, Fort Lauderdale, Florida, crossing the New River and connecting the Sailboat Bend neighborhood with the Riverside Park neighborhood
 Songo Lock Bridge, Naples, Maine; carries Songo Lock Road over the Songo River just upstream of the lock. Powered by human operator turning gears using a removable crank. Not to be confused with a former swing bridge about two miles upstream which carried US 302 until replaced with a fixed span in May 2012. 
 South Bristol, Maine Asymmetric swing bridge connecting Rutherford Island to the mainland.
 Southport, ME connects Southport Island to Boothbay Harbor on Route 27. 
 Spokane Street Bridge over the Duwamish Waterway in Seattle, Washington, built 1991. Features two reinforced concrete, serial swing spans, each rotating 45 degrees 
 St. Joseph Swing Bridge over the Missouri River, St. Joseph, Missouri (1904)
 Topsail Island Swing Bridge, Surf City, North Carolina (Constructed in the 1950s, the swing bridge was demolished after being replaced by a fixed-span high rise bridge in 2018).
 Trail Creek Swing Bridge in Michigan City, Indiana, carrying the Michigan Central Railroad (now operated by Amtrak)
 Torry Island Swing Bridge, Torry Island, Florida
 Umpqua River Bridge near Reedsport, Oregon on US-101
 Victory Bridge, crossing the Raritan River in Perth Amboy, New Jersey (taken down in 2003)
 Walt Disney World Railroad (former Florida East Coast Railway) swing bridge, Bay Lake, Florida
 Woods Memorial Bridge over the Beaufort River in Beaufort, South Carolina
 Yancopin Bridge, Arkansas River, southeastern Arkansas. Former Missouri Pacific railroad bridge with separate vertical-lift and swing trusses now part of rail-trail; swing span now manually operated 
 State Hwy 87 northbound bridge the eastern boundary of Bridge City, Texas

Omaha NE Turn Style Bridge is now a historical landmark. Located 86H674H5+98 Used for rail transport. Connecting Council Bluffs, Iowa to downtown Omaha, Nebraska

Uruguay

Carmelo Bridge. Built in 1912 is the oldest swing bridge in all of Latin America.
Barra del Santa Lucia Bridge. Built in 1925 as a railway bridge, today is used only by pedestrians.

Vietnam
 Han River Bridge in Da Nang

See also

 Movable bridges for a list of other movable bridge types

References

External links

Video of manually operated railroad swing bridge over the Lewes & Rehoboth Canal, Lewes, Delaware, 2008

 
Bridges by structural type